The 1893–94 season was Stoke's fifth season in the Football League.

Stoke finished the season in 11th position after picking up 29 points of which 27 were claimed at the Victoria Ground. Indeed, Stoke's home form of 1893–94 was excellent with 13 wins from 15 but their away from was terrible as they failed to win any away game during the season. Stoke also competed in the short lived United Counties League which was won on goal average by West Bromwich Albion.

Season review

League
In 1893–94 the Stoke side was broken up with Alf Underwood, Bill Rowley and Ted Evans all losing their first choice status. Eleventh place in the table was achieved, thanks in main to an excellent home record of 13 wins from 15. The only defeat in front of their own fans came shortly after Christmas when Wolverhampton Wanderers won 3–0 whilst eventual champions Aston Villa were held 3–3 in the other game. As their home form was good Stoke's away from was awful picking up just two points and conceded 62 goals on their travels. Indeed, from 1 April 1893 to 17 March 1895 not one away win was gained and by coincidence it was Sheffield Wednesday whom Stoke beat on each occasion at the start and at the end of that dismal run. There was tragedy during the season as young defender Jack Proctor fell ill with pneumonia and died at the age of 22.

Stoke also competed in the United Counties League this season which involved two groups of four teams playing each other twice and the winners of each group playing each other to win the title. Stoke finished 2nd in their group behind West Bromwich Albion on goal average. West Brom went on to lose to Derby County in the final. The tournament failed to get the supporters in through the gates and after just one season the United Counties League was scrapped.

FA Cup
Season 1893–94 also saw one of Stoke's best FA Cup displays since they entered the competition in 1883. Competing in gale-force winds, they knocked out Everton 1–0 with a Joe Schofield goal in the final minute of the match. The Stoke players were praised by watching reporters for making the match highly entertaining in difficult conditions. Alas they went out in the next round defeated by Sheffield Wednesday.

Final league table

Results

Stoke's score comes first

Legend

Football League First Division

FA Cup

United Counties League

 Derby County won the other group and beat West Bromwich Albion in the final. The United Counties League was not deemed a success due to poor attendances and was scrapped after just one season.

Table

Squad statistics

References

Stoke City F.C. seasons
Stoke